Mohammed Amin may refer to:

Mohammed Amin (politician) (1928–2018), Indian politician
Mohammed Amin (boxer) (born 1913), Egyptian boxer
Mohammed Amin (businessman), British Muslim businessman

See also
Mohamed Amin (1943–1996), Kenyan photojournalist
Mohamed Amin (Egyptian film director), Egyptian film director
Mohamed Amin (footballer), Sudanese association footballer
Mohamed Amin Didi (1910–1954), Maldivian politician
Mohammed Amyn (born 1976), Moroccan long-distance runner
Mohammad Amin (historian) (1928–2012), Indian historian
Mohammad Amin (Pakistani cricketer) (born 1920), Pakistani cricketer
Mohammad Amin (Kuwaiti cricketer) (born 1987), Kuwaiti cricketer
Mohamed Salah Amin (born 1947), Egyptian boxer